Tom Agna is an American comedian, actor, producer, and comic writer.

Career 
As an actor, Agna appeared in episodes of Seinfeld, one of Dr. Katz, Professional Therapist, Conan O'Brien, Jay Leno, and David Letterman multiple times. His success in the comedy industry began in the mid 1990s. He has also written for a number of comedies which include The Chris Rock Show, Late Night with Conan O'Brien, Mad TV, George Lopez, Weekends at the D.L., and the documentary P. Diddy Presents the Bad Boys of Comedy.

Agna shared an Emmy for his work on The Chris Rock Show and a Writers Guild of America Award for writing on Late Night with Conan O'Brien.

Filmography

Television

References

American comedy writers
Writers from Massachusetts
Emmy Award winners
Living people
Year of birth missing (living people)
Writers Guild of America Award winners